Alfred Scriven (born 26 January 1998) is a Kenyan-born Norwegian professional footballer who plays as a forward for Hødd. and Kenya. 

Loaned to Ullensaker/Kisa in 2019, he went on his second loan in 2020, to Asker.

Career statistics

Notes

References

1998 births
Living people
Norwegian footballers
Mjøndalen IF players
Ullensaker/Kisa IL players
Asker Fotball players
IL Hødd players
Norwegian First Division players
Eliteserien players
Association football forwards